SIBC may refer to:

 Second International Bahá'í Council, an institution recognized by several competing Bahá'í divisions
 SIBC, the local independent radio station in Shetland, Scotland
 Solomon Islands Broadcasting Corporation, the official radio and television broadcaster of the Solomon Islands
 Shanghai Institute for Biological Sciences, a branch of Chinese Academy of Sciences